Caelostomus minor is a species of ground beetle in the subfamily Pterostichinae. It was described by Karl Jordan in 1894.

References

Caelostomus
Beetles described in 1894